Gallodoro (Sicilian: Jaddudoru) is a comune (municipality) in the Province of Messina in Sicily, Italy located about  east of Palermo and about  southwest of Messina.

Gallodoro borders the following municipalities: Forza d'Agrò, Letojanni, Mongiuffi Melia.

Demographic evolution

References

Cities and towns in Sicily